Batgirl is an unreleased American superhero film based on the DC Comics character Barbara Gordon / Batgirl. Produced by Burr! Productions and DC Films for the streaming service HBO Max, it was intended to be an installment in the DC Extended Universe (DCEU). The film was directed by Adil El Arbi and Bilall Fallah from a screenplay by Christina Hodson, and starred Leslie Grace as Batgirl, alongside J. K. Simmons, Jacob Scipio, Brendan Fraser, and Michael Keaton.

Development of a Batgirl feature film began with Joss Whedon in March 2017, but he left the project a year later. Hodson was hired to write a new script in April 2018, with El Arbi and Fallah hired to direct in May 2021 when the film was confirmed as an HBO Max original. Grace was cast that July, and filming took place in Glasgow, Scotland, from November 2021 to March 2022. In August 2022, DC Films and HBO Max parent Warner Bros. Discovery announced that, while the film had entered post-production, the studio no longer planned to release it due to the company's cost-cutting measures and a refocus on theatrical releases.

Cast 
 Leslie Grace as Barbara Gordon / Batgirl:A vigilante in Gotham City and the daughter of police commissioner James Gordon. Grace said that "[t]here's not a lot of nuances in her thinking at the beginning of the story" and that she "[vacillates] between the nuances of life and good and bad and black and white and that there so much in between", but that the character would "discover a lot about parts of herself" throughout the story that cause her to change her worldview.
 J. K. Simmons as James Gordon:The commissioner of Gotham City Police Department, Barbara's father, and a close ally of Batman. Simmons said the film would explore the character outside of his job as commissioner, showing "much more of a domestic aspect of Jim Gordon" through his relationship with Barbara.
 Jacob Scipio as Anthony Bressi: A mob boss in Gotham City.
 Brendan Fraser as Ted Carson / Firefly: A disgruntled veteran who becomes a sociopathic pyromaniac. Fraser said that Carson had an original backstory, rather than being adapted from a previous version of the character.
 Michael Keaton as Bruce Wayne / Batman: A wealthy socialite from an alternate universe of Gotham City who moonlights as a crimefighting vigilante.
 Ivory Aquino as Alysia Yeoh: A bartender and Barbara's best friend.

Additionally, Rebecca Front, Corey Johnson, and Ethan Kai were cast in undisclosed roles, with Kai being referred to as a "leading" character. The character Killer Moth was also expected to appear.

Production

Development 
In May 2016, the DC Comics character Barbara Gordon / Batgirl had the potential to appear in a female superhero team-up film starring Margot Robbie as Harley Quinn, which became Birds of Prey (2020). Batgirl was ultimately not included in the film due to the development of a solo film starring the character. Joss Whedon was hired in March 2017 to write, direct, and produce the solo film, which was being overseen by Warner Bros. Pictures president Toby Emmerich and DC Films chairmen Jon Berg and Geoff Johns. Whedon was to begin production on the film in 2018, but left the project in February 2018 after being unable to come up with a story for it. There was also additional scrutiny on Whedon as a male director of a female-focused film, with Warner Bros. and new DC Films president Walter Hamada planning at that point to replace Whedon with a female filmmaker.

Birds of Prey writer Christina Hodson was hired to write a new screenplay for Batgirl in April 2018 and was expected to begin writing the film after completing her work on another DC Extended Universe (DCEU) film, The Flash (2023). In December 2020, Batgirl was listed as a film that could potentially be released exclusively on the streaming service HBO Max, rather than in theaters, as part of Hamada's new plan for the DCEU, and in April 2021 it was included on DC's slate of films that were expected to be released in 2022 or 2023. Adil El Arbi and Bilall Fallah, both of whom were longtime fans of the character, were hired to direct the film a month later, when it was confirmed to be planned as an HBO Max original. Kristin Burr was producing the film by that time, and said the directors were bringing an excited energy that would make the film a "fun ride" and show a different side of Gotham City from previous DC projects.

In April 2022, following the WarnerMedia merger with Discovery and the fall in stock prices for Netflix, executives at Warner Bros. were reportedly considering a switch for the film from a streaming release with a budget of around $70 million to a theatrical release with increased budget for post-production and a larger marketing push.

Casting 
DC executives began testing actresses for Batgirl in the week of July 19, 2021, with the group reportedly including Isabela Merced, Zoey Deutch, Leslie Grace, and Haley Lu Richardson; Richardson and Grace were considered to be the top contenders. Richardson went through several stages of auditioning, but Grace was cast in the role on July 21. By July 29, J. K. Simmons was in talks to reprise his role as Batgirl's father, Commissioner Gordon, from Justice League (2017) and its 2021 director's cut. Simmons was confirmed to be reprising his role for the film in October.

Also in October, Jacob Scipio and Brendan Fraser joined the cast, the latter as the villain Firefly. Fraser previously portrayed Cliff Steele / Robotman in the DC Comics television series Doom Patrol. Though it was initially reported that Fraser would portray the Garfield Lynns iteration, he later clarified in July 2022 that he was playing the Ted Carson iteration, with an original backstory not adapted from existing material. The villain role was originally offered to Sylvester Stallone, who voiced King Shark in the DCEU film The Suicide Squad (2021), but "things just didn't work out". Scipio portrays mob boss Anthony Bressi in the film.

El Arbi and Fallah said Batman would appear in the film but declined to confirm if Ben Affleck would reprise his role from previous DCEU projects. In December, Michael Keaton was revealed to be appearing in Batgirl, reprising his role as Batman from the films Batman (1989) and Batman Returns (1992). Keaton had been expected to first reprise the role for the DCEU in The Flash prior to that film's delay to 2023. Rebecca Front, Corey Johnson, Ethan Kai, and Ivory Aquino also joined the cast, with Aquino playing Alysia Yeoh, the first major transgender character in a DC film.

Filming and post-production 
Principal photography began in Glasgow, doubling for Gotham City, on November 30, 2021, under the working title Cherry Hill. John Mathieson serves as cinematographer. El Arbi and Fallah had arrived in Glasgow on August 24 to prepare for filming, and scouted locations with production designer Christopher Glass. Glasgow was previously used to depict Gotham City in The Flash as well as the non-DCEU film The Batman (2022). Filming officially wrapped on March 31, 2022. In April 2022, Arbi and Fallah exited Beverly Hills Cop IV to focus on Batgirl. The film was in post-production by the time its release was canceled in August 2022, with Martin Walsh serving as editor. It did not have completed visual effects and still required the filming of some scenes.

Music 
Natalie Holt announced in September 2021 that she would compose the score. She reached out to Danny Elfman regarding her plans to use the original Batman theme for Michael Keaton's character, and she received his permission.

Marketing 
El Arbi, Fallah, Hodson, and Grace promoted the film at the virtual DC FanDome event in October 2021, where they discussed their preparation for filming and revealed concept art. Grace revealed a first look at herself in costume as Batgirl in January 2022.

Cancellation 

In August 2022, Warner Bros. Discovery (WBD) announced that it no longer planned to release Batgirl on HBO Max or theatrically, despite a previously-scheduled 2022 release on HBO Max. TheWrap reported that WBD felt the film "simply did not work" and went against the new desire and mandate from CEO David Zaslav to make DC films "big theatrical event films". The Guardian reported that this put Batgirl "among the most expensive canceled cinematic projects ever".

Collider, Rolling Stone, and Reuters reported that test screening responses were negative, which might have been a factor in WBD's decision; Colliders sources described the film as "a huge disappointment [that] looked cheap in comparison to other films". Rolling Stone said that WBD determined that spending an additional $7–9 million during post-production in an effort to bring Batgirl to the level of other theatrical DC films, such as Shazam! Fury of the Gods (2023), would be fruitless. However, Variety denied that the film's quality factored into the decision, reaffirming, along with The Hollywood Reporter and Deadline Hollywood, that it was part of the studio's larger cost-cutting measures, given the budget increased from an initial $70 million to $90 million, and the desire for DC films to be theatrical blockbusters. Deadline noted that test screenings showed temporary versions of the visual effects, "which tend to temper audience enthusiasm".

A subsequent Variety report indicated that WBD had concluded that writing off Batgirl for a tax break would be the most "financially sound" way of recouping its costs instead of moving the film to a theatrical release with additional investment, selling it to another distributor, or releasing it on HBO Max. Deadline reported that the filmmakers had been told that WBD specifically wanted to take advantage of a purchase accounting maneuver, related to the WarnerMedia–Discovery merger and related strategy changes, that had to be invoked by mid-August. Hamada was not consulted regarding the decision and only learned about it when Warner Bros. Pictures Group co-chairpersons and CEOs Michael De Luca and Pam Abdy informed him at a test screening for Black Adam (2022). Hamada was upset and considered resigning, but agreed to stay at least until Black Adam release.

The cast and crew did not learn of the cancellation until after the New York Post broke the story on August 2; El Arbi and Fallah were in Morocco for El Arbi's wedding when they were informed. They released a statement on August 3 that they were "saddened and shocked", but thanked the cast and said they were grateful to have contributed to the DCEU. Film industry figures, including Keaton, Marvel Studios president Kevin Feige, and film directors Edgar Wright and James Gunn, reached out to El Arbi and Fallah to express support. Following the announcement of the cancellation, El Arbi and Fallah attempted to log into the Warner Bros. servers to capture some of the footage on their cellphones, but they were unable to. Warner Bros. did set up some secret screenings of the unfinished film on its lot, exclusive to cast and crew who had worked on the film, along with their representatives and company executives.

In January 2023, DC Studios co-head Peter Safran said the film was "not releasable" as it "would not have been able to compete in the theatrical marketplace; it was built for the small screen". Though he praised the talents of the actors and crew, he added that had it released, it would have "hurt" the DC brand and those involved.

Future 
Prior to the film's cancellation, Grace and Margot Robbie both expressed interest on a crossover between Batgirl and Robbie's Harley Quinn. Grace said in April 2022 that there were discussions between the crew regarding the plot for a Batgirl sequel, but whether a sequel was greenlit would have depended on the film's reception upon release. When WBD announced the film's cancellation, it stated that it hoped to work on other projects with El Arbi, Fallah, and Grace. Deadline reported that Warner Bros. was attempting to renegotiate its deals with the three at that time. After James Gunn and Peter Safran were named to oversee DC Studios, both El Arbi and Fallah told Variety they were open to working with the revamped DC film slate down the road, if asked. Safran also noted Batgirl would "inevitably" be included in DC Studios DC Universe story.

See also 
List of abandoned and unfinished films

References

External links 
 

2020s unfinished films
American action films
American superhero films
Batgirl
Cancelled films
DC Extended Universe films
Films based on DC Comics
Films directed by Adil El Arbi and Bilall Fallah
Films scored by Natalie Holt
Films shot in Glasgow
Films with screenplays by Christina Hodson
HBO Max films
Superheroine films
Unreleased American films
2022 controversies in the United States
Film controversies in the United States